Dolichometopidae is a family of corynexochid trilobites that lived in the Cambrian, from the lower Botomian to the Dresbachian. It contains the following genera:

Aegunaspis
Amphoton
Anoria
Asperocare
Athabaskia
Athabaskiella
Atypicus
Basanellus
Bathyuriscidella
Bathyuriscus
Borovikovia
Centonella
Chilometopus
Chilonorria
Clavaspidella
Corynexochides
Deiradonyx
Dolicholeptus
Dolichometopsis
Dolichometopus
Drozdoviella
Erratobalticus
Ezhuangia
Fuchouia
Glossopleura
?Granularaspis
Guraspis
?Hanburia
Hemirhodon
Horonastes
Itydeois
Kannoriella
Klotziella
Lianhuashania
Mendospidella
Neopoliellina
Parapoliella
Poliella
Poliellaspidella
Poliellaspis
Poliellina
Politinella
Polypleuraspis
Prosymphysurus
Pseudamphoton
Ptannigania
Saimixiella
Sestrostega
Shanghaia
Sinijanella
Suvorovaaspis
Undillia
Zhenpingaspis

References

 
Corynexochina
Trilobite families
Cambrian trilobites
Cambrian first appearances
Miaolingian extinctions